Nauvoo University was a private academic institution organized by members of the Church of Jesus Christ of Latter-day Saints (LDS Church) in Nauvoo, Illinois.  It began operating in 2009 and ceased operating the following year.

University of Nauvoo (1841–45)

After the Mormons had been expelled from Missouri, they crossed into Illinois and settled in Nauvoo in 1839.  They were granted a city charter from the Illinois state legislature in December 1840, which included authorization to found a university. The school was founded in 1841 as the University of the City of Nauvoo, or the University of Nauvoo.

The University of Nauvoo ended after the 1844 murder of Joseph Smith, when the interest of many church leaders moved toward westward migration.   It served as the inspiration for the Nauvoo University of 2009.

Nauvoo University (2009-2010)

Nauvoo University was intended to be a reorganization of its 1840s predecessor.  It took its mission statement from Joseph Smith's comment on the old university:
The University of the City of Nauvoo will enable us to teach our children wisdom—to instruct them in all knowledge, and learning, in the Arts, Sciences and Learned Professions. We hope to make this institution one of the great lights of the world, and by and through it, to diffuse that kind of knowledge which will be of practical utility, and for the public good, and also for private and individual happiness.

Like LDS Church-owned colleges, such as Brigham Young University (BYU),  and other LDS-related colleges such as Southern Virginia University, Nauvoo University promoted the moral standards of the LDS Church.

Board of Trustees 
The school drew interest from leaders and educators from the LDS community and the areas of Nauvoo, western Illinois, and southeastern Iowa.  Its governing body was a 24-member Board of Trustees:

By January 2009, Harrop, having expressed concerns regarding the lack of operational and financial preparedness for opening the university in fall 2009, was no longer a member of the board of trustees.  By July 2010, Black and Bell were no longer members of the board.

First year and indefinite closure 
The university opened in fall 2009, anticipating around 50 students and 20 employees as faculty, administration, and staff.  It planned to organize as a 501(c)(3) non-profit institution.  The school anticipated future donations to help it survive.

Chris Benedict, one of the first students at the University, won the U.S. Cyber Challenge in Washington D.C. in December 2009.

Among the members of Nauvoo University's faculty as of summer 2010 was Clayne Robison, former director of BYU's Opera Program.  His wife, Vivien Robison, who had been a part-time faculty member at BYU and sang in the Mormon Tabernacle Choir, was also on the faculty.  Evan L. Ivie, who has a Ph.D. from MIT and was a professor of Computer Science at BYU for several years, was another early faculty member.  Ivie had been director of the BYU Nauvoo program from 2002 until it was discontinued in 2006.  Nauvoo University expected more retired professors would to come to teach in the city and local church members would assist in its beginnings.

Realizing difficulties in its first year, the organization changed its name to "Nauvoo Study Program," then in September 2010 it was discontinued indefinitely.  In a letter posted to the school's website, Evan Ivie cited insufficient donations, faculty, staff, and students as contributing to this decision.

The Nauvoo Studies Program, as of 2017, continued operation.  The program consists of 15 weeks of lectures related to the early history of the Church of Jesus Christ of Latter-day Saints.  The program is designed for students who are enrolled in a college. Many students take college courses at other institutions while enrolled in the program.

See also
 Joseph Smith Academy

References

External links
Official web site

Defunct private universities and colleges in Illinois
Education in Hancock County, Illinois
Educational institutions disestablished in 2010
Educational institutions established in 2009
Latter Day Saint movement in Illinois
Latter Day Saint universities and colleges
Nauvoo, Illinois
2009 establishments in Illinois